The Intermesenteric plexus is a nerve plexus on the abdominal aorta, between the exits of the superior and inferior mesenteric artery.

The lumbar splanchnic nerves terminate here, among other places.

References

Nerve plexus